Hindustan Petroleum Corporation Limited (HPCL), commonly referred to as HP, is a subsidiary of Oil and Natural Gas Corporation which is in turn under the ownership of the Ministry of Petroleum and Natural Gas, Government of India. It is headquartered in Mumbai. Since 2018, Oil and Natural Gas Corporation has owned majority of its stake. It is ranked 367th on the Fortune Global 500 list of the world's biggest corporations as of 2016. On 24 October 2019, it became a Maharatna PSU.

History

HPCL was incorporated in 1974 after the takeover and merger of erstwhile Esso Standard and Lube India Limited by the Esso (Acquisition of Undertakings in India) Act 1974. Caltex Oil Refining (India) Ltd. (CORIL) was taken over by the Government of India in 1976 and merged with HPCL in 1978 by the CORIL-HPCL Amalgamation Order 1978. Kosan Gas Company was merged with HPCL in 1979 by the Kosangas Company Acquisition Act 1979.

In 2003, following a petition by the Centre for Public Interest Litigation (CPIL), the Supreme Court of India restrained the central government from privatizing Hindustan Petroleum and Bharat Petroleum without the approval of Parliament. As counsel for the CPIL, Rajinder Sachar and Prashant Bhushan said that the only way to disinvest in the companies would be to repeal or amend the Acts by which they were nationalized in the 1970s. As a result, the government would need a majority in both houses to push through any privatization.

HPCL has been steadily growing over the years. The refining capacity increased from 5.5 million metric tonnes (MMT) in 1984–85 to 14.80 million metric tonnes as of March 2013. On the financial front, the net income from sales and operations grew from 2,687 crores in 1984–1985 to 2,06,529 crores in the 2012–13 financial year. During the 2013–14 financial year, the company's net profit was 1,740 crores. During the 2021–22 financial year following the COVID-19 pandemic, HPCL's profit was ₹6,383 crore and its revenue was ₹ 3,72,642 crore (its highest ever, up by 38%).

Merger and acquisition

On 19 July 2017, the Government of India announced the acquisition of HPCL by the Oil and Natural Gas Corporation (ONGC).
On 1 November 2017, the Union Cabinet approved ONGC for acquiring a majority 51.11% stake in HPCL. On 30 January 2018, ONGC acquired the entire 51.11% stake, thus gaining majority ownership.

Operations

HPCL wholly owns two major refineries in India: one in Mumbai (west coast) with a capacity of 9.5 million tonnes per year, and one in Visakhapatnam (east coast) with a capacity of 8.3 million tonnes per year.

In addition, HPCL holds an equity stake of 16.95% in Mangalore Refinery and Petrochemicals Limited, a company that runs a state-of-the-art refinery in Mangalore with a capacity over 9 million tonnes per year. HMEL, a joint venture between HPCL and Mittal Energy Investments Pte. Ltd, operates another refinery of 9 million tonnes per year in Bathinda, Punjab. HPCL has signed a memorandum of understanding with the Government of Rajasthan for constructing a refinery near Barmer; it would be operated under a joint venture company called HPCL–Rajasthan Refinery Limited.

HPCL also owns and operates the largest lubricant refinery in India, with a capacity of 335,000 metric tonnes, producing lube base oils of international standards. This refinery accounts for over 40% of India's total lube base oil production. Presently, HPCL produces over 300 grades of lubes, specialties, and greases.

The marketing network of HPCL consists of 21 zonal offices in major cities and 128 regional offices facilitated by a supply and distribution infrastructure comprising terminals, aviation service facilities, liquefied petroleum gas bottling plants and distributors, lube filling plants and distributors, inland relay depots, and retail outlets (petrol pumps).

HPCL has a state-of-the-art information technology infrastructure to support its core business. The data center is at Hitech city in Hyderabad.

Facilities 

HPCL operates refineries in India, including:
 Mumbai Refinery: 9.5 million metric tons capacity (fuel and lubes)
 Visakhapatnam Refinery: 8.3 million metric tons capacity (fuel)
 Mangalore Refinery: 9.69 million metric tons capacity (HPCL has a 16.65% stake)
 Guru Gobind Singh Refinery (Bathinda): 9 million metric tons capacity (HPCL and Mittal Energy each have a 49% stake)
 Barmer Refinery: planned for a 9 million metric tons capacity (HPCL has a 74%, Rajasthan Government has a 24% stake)
In addition, HPCL operates other manufacturing facilities, including:

 Silvassa Lube: a state-of-the-art plant for grease and specialties, and one of the most advanced fully automated installations in Asia
 Lube & Grease manufacturing facility (Mazagaon, Mumbai)
 LPG storage Cavern: one of the biggest storage facilities of LPG in Asia at Vizag—SALPG
 Pipelines: MPSPL, MDPL, VVSPL, MHMSPL, RKPL, ASPL, RBPL
 Several terminals and depots
 Many liquified petroleum gas bottling plants
 HPCL Green R&D Centre (Bengaluru)

Products

HPCL produces a wide variety of petroleum fuels and specialties:
 Petrol (known as "motor spirit" in the oil industry) – HPCL markets its petrol at its retail pumps all over India. Its principal consumers are personal vehicle owners.
 Diesel (known as "high-speed diesel" in the oil industry) – HPCL markets its diesel at its retail pumps, terminals, and depots. Its consumers include personal vehicle owners, transport agencies, and industries.
 Lubricants – HPCL is the market leader in lubricants and associated products. It commands over 30% of the market share in this sector. The popular brands of HP lubes are Laal Ghoda, HP Milcy, Thanda Raja, Koolgard, and Racer4.
 Liquified petroleum gas – HPCL's brand of liquified petroleum gas is popular across India for domestic and industrial uses.
 Aviation turbine fuel – With major air service facilities in all major airports of India, HPCL is a key player in this sector, supplying turbine fuel to major airlines. It also supplies fuel to the US.
 Emulsions – HPCL manufactures mineral turpentine oil.
HPCL also offers HP Drive Track Plus cards for consumers purchasing their products, and provides cashback as per the government cashback offers.

International rankings
 HPCL is a Fortune Global 500 company and was ranked at position 259 in 2013. In 2016, HPCL was ranked 367.
 HPCL was featured on the Forbes Global 2000 list for 2013 at position 1217.
 HPCL was the 10th most valuable brand in India according to an annual survey conducted by Brand Finance and The Economic Times in 2010.

Major ongoing projects
 Uran–Chakan–Shikrapur LPG Pipeline (UCSPL)
 Vijayawada–Dharmapuri Pipeline (VDPL)
 Palanpur Vadodara Pipeline (PVPL)
 Visakh Refinery Modernization Project
Barmer Refinery RAJASTHAN
Mumbai Refinery Expansion Project

Subsidiaries

Hindustan Petroleum Gas

HPCL is focused on the appraisal and development of hydrocarbon accumulations in onshore and offshore projects. Operating projects include the Hirapur Marginal oil fields of the Cambay basin (near Gandhinagar, Gujarat) under a service contract with ONGC, and the pre-NELP production sharing contract for the Sanganpur field (Mehsana) with M/s Hydrocarbon Development Company (P) Ltd.
 HPCL Biofuels Limited
 CREDA-HPCL Biofuels Limited
 HPCL Rajasthan Refinery Limited
 HP Gas (domestic and industrial natural gas)

See also

 Hindustan Platinum
 List of companies of India
 List of largest companies by revenue
 List of corporations by market capitalization
 Make in India
 Forbes Global 2000
 Fortune India 500
 Rajiv Gandhi Institute of Petroleum Technology

References

External links

 

 
1974 establishments in Maharashtra
Companies based in Mumbai
Companies nationalised by the Government of India
Government-owned companies of India
Indian brands
Non-renewable resource companies established in 1974
Oil and gas companies of India
Oil and Natural Gas Corporation
India
Companies listed on the National Stock Exchange of India
Companies listed on the Bombay Stock Exchange